Maillé is a commune in the Vendée department in the Pays de la Loire region in western France. The musicologist Damien Poisblaud was born in Maillé.

See also
Communes of the Vendée department

References

Communes of Vendée